An Ecclesiastical Residence, sometimes called a presbytery is the residence of a cleric in their diocese or parish.

References

Types of Roman Catholic organization